Just Tryin' ta Live is the second solo studio album by American rapper Devin the Dude. It was released on August 27, 2002 via Rap-A-Lot Records. Production was handled by mostly by Rob Quest, Michael "Domo" Poye and Mike Dean, alongside several other record producers including David Banner, DJ Premier, Dr. Dre and N.O. Joe. It features guest appearances from Odd Squad, Nas, Pooh Bear, Raphael Saadiq and Xzibit. The album has no charting singles, but it peaked at number 61 on the Billboard 200 in the United States.

Track listing

Charts

References

External links

2002 albums
Albums produced by DJ Premier
Albums produced by Dr. Dre
Albums produced by Raphael Saadiq
Albums produced by Mike Dean (record producer)
Albums produced by N.O. Joe
Devin the Dude albums
Rap-A-Lot Records albums